Kalagh Neshin may refer to:
 Kalagh Neshin, Markazi
 Kalagh Neshin, Qom